John Robson McDougall (2 March 1886 — 1 April 1971) was a Scottish first-class cricketer.

The son of Thomas McDougall, he was born at Galashiels in March 1886. A club cricketer for Gala Cricket Club, McDougall made a single appearance in first-class cricket for Scotland against Ireland at Dublin in 1912. Playing as a wicket-keeper in the Scottish side, he was dismissed in the Scotland first innings for 12 runs by Robert Gregory, while in their second innings he was dismissed for 3 runs by William Harrington. As wicket-keeper, he took one catch, with Scotland winning the match by the narrow margin of 3 runs. By profession, McDougall was a tailor's merchant. He died at Ayr in April 1971, having been suffering from broncial pneumonia.

References

External links
 

1886 births
1971 deaths
People from Galashiels
Scottish cricketers
Deaths from pneumonia in Scotland